Arundell may refer to:
 Anne Arundell (1615-1649) Baroness Baltimore and namesake of Anne Arundel County, Maryland
Arundell Esdaile (1880-1956), British librarian, Secretary to the British Museum, 1926-40
Arundell family, a notable Cornish family
Baron Arundell of Trerice
Baron Arundell of Wardour
C. Rogers Arundell (1885–1968), judge of the United States Tax Court
Dennis Arundell (1898–1988), English actor, librettist, opera scholar, translator, producer, director, conductor and composer of incidental music
Francis Vyvyan Jago Arundell (1780–1846), English antiquary and oriental traveller, born F. V. Jago
Humphrey Arundell, leader of the Cornish rebellion of 1549
Sir John Arundell of Lanherne (died 1379), English naval commander
Peter Arundell (1933–2009), British motor racing driver

See also
 Arundel (disambiguation)